Claude Rostand (3 December 1912 – 9 October 1970) was a French musicologist, musicographer and music critic.

Biography 
While studying literature and law at the Sorbonne, Rostand studied piano, harmony, counterpoint and musical composition in private at the Conservatoire de Paris with Jacques Février, Norbert Dufourcq, Édouard Mignan and Marc Vaubourgoin.

A humanist, known for his great erudition, he entered as a music critic for the newspaper Le Monde, the Figaro littéraire and the magazine Carrefour. He was also a French correspondent for the magazines Melos and Musical America as well as The New York Times. A lecturer by the Jeunesses musicales de France, he participated in numerous programs at the ORTF and worked for various German radio stations. He gave a series of radio lectures under the title "Éphémérides de la musique contemporaine".

In 1958, he organized concerts of contemporary music at the Théâtre national populaire under the name "Musique d’aujourd’hui".
In 1961 he became vice-president of the ISCM (International Society for Contemporary Music).
In 1966, he directed a film on Erik Satie for Baden-Baden television.

Open to all kinds of music, Claude Rostand was particularly interested in the study of the 1800s and the avant-garde music of the 1900s.

Writings 
1945: L’œuvre de Gabriel Fauré
1945: Petit guide de l’auditeur de musique: les chefs-d’œuvre du piano 
1952: Petit guide de l’auditeur de musique: les chefs-d’œuvre de la musique de chambre
1952: La Musique française contemporaine
1952: Avec Darius Milhaud: Entretiens avec Claude Rostand
1954: Avec Francis Poulenc: Entretiens avec Claude Rostand
1954–5: Brahms 
1957: L'oeuvre de Pierre-Octave Ferroud : catalogue 
1957: Olivier Messiaen
1959: Avec Igor Markevitch: Entretiens avec Claude Rostand
1960: Liszt, Éditions du Seuil, series Solfèges, #15
1960:  La musique allemande
1964: Richard Strauss: l’homme et son œuvre
1967: Hugo Wolf
1969: Anton Webern
1970: Dictionnaire de la musique contemporaine

In addition, Claude Rostand participated in several collective publications:
1960–1963: Histoire de la musique dein the Bibliothèque de la Pléiade
1963: Stravinski, collective work
1965–66: La musique sérielle d'aujourd'hui, in an investigation led by André Boucourechliev 
1970: Schumann, collective work.

Prix Claude Rostand 
Every year, the professional syndicate of theater, music and dance critics presents its Grands Prix, which distinguishes the shows and artistic personalities that marked the season. The "Prix Claude-Rostand" rewards a lyrical production.

Bibliography 
 Yvonne Tiénot. "Rostand, Claude." Grove Music Online. Oxford Music Online. 29 Jun. 2011
 ISCM site de l’International Society for Contemporary Music.

External links 
 Claude Rostand on Encyclopédie Larousse
 Claude Rostand on Discogs
 Entretiens avec Claude Rostand on Data.bnf.fr
 Claude Rostand, Johannes Brahms on Fayard
 Claude Rostand on GoodReads

20th-century French musicologists
French music critics
Writers from Paris
1912 births
1970 deaths
Writers about music